Paul Guy Pearson (December 5, 1926 – August 12, 2000) was an American academic, who served as president of Miami University and as acting president of Rutgers University. He came to Miami University after serving as executive vice president at Rutgers.

Biography

Pearson was born and educated in Lake Worth, Florida on December 5, 1926. Dr. Pearson received his bachelor's degree in 1949, Masters in 1951, and Ph.D. in 1954; all from the University of Florida.

Pearson began his academic career as an Assistant Professor at the University of Tulsa in 1954. From 1960 to 1981, he was a zoology professor at Rutgers, also serving as Associate Provost from 1972 to 1977, and Executive Vice President from 1977 to 1981.

In 1981 Pearson was made the President of Miami University. He served as the head of this institution until 1992.

Pearson died on August 12, 2000, in Oxford, Ohio.

Legacy 
Pearson Hall on the Miami University campus is named in his honor.

References

External links

Info on Dr. Pearson
NY Times info on Dr. Pearson

1926 births
2000 deaths
20th-century American zoologists
University of Florida alumni
Presidents of Miami University
Rutgers University faculty
Burials at Oxford Cemetery, Oxford, Ohio
Fellows of the Ecological Society of America
20th-century American academics